Dannreuther is a surname. Notable people with the surname include:

 Edward Dannreuther (1844–1905), British pianist of Alsatian descent
 Gustav Dannreuther (1853–1923), American violinist of Alsatian descent, brother of Edward
 Hubert Edward Dannreuther (1880–1977), British admiral, son of Edward